The Administrative Divisions of the Maldives refers to the various units of government that provide local government services in the Maldives. According to the Decentralization Act 2010, the administrative divisions of the Maldives would consist of atolls, islands, and cities; each administered by their own local council, under the basic terms of home rule. Geographically, the Maldives are formed by a number of natural atolls plus a few islands and isolated reefs which form a pattern from North to South. Administratively, there are currently 189 islands, 18 atolls and 4 cities in the Maldives.

Background

During the Gayyoom Presidency
During the presidency of Maumoon Abdul Gayyoom, the administrative divisions consisted of 20 administrative atolls, all controlled by the central government in Malé.

Seven Provinces
In 2008, in an attempt of decentralization, the Nasheed government divided the country into seven provinces. According to this system, the bill submitted by the government to decentralize the country was passed with the support of opposition-majority parliament, with their amendments to the bill. The final bill passed in 2010 by the parliament and ratified by the president saw the country's decentralisation as 21 constituencies.

The seven provinces were the following, followed by the atolls grouped within:

 Upper North Province (consisting of Haa Alif, Haa Dhaalu and Shaviyani Atolls; capital: Kulhudhuffushi)
 North Province (consisting of Baa, Lhaviyani, Noonu and Raa Atolls; capital: Felivaru)
 North Central Province (consisting of Alif Alif, Alif Dhaal, Kaafu and Vaavu Atolls, and Malé City; capital: Thulusdhoo)
 Central Province (consisting of Dhaalu, Faafu and Meemu Atolls; capital: Kudahuvadhoo)
 South Central Province (consisting of Thaa and Laamu Atolls; capital: Gan)
 Upper South Province (consisting of Gaafu Alif and Gaafu Dhaalu Atolls; capital: Thinadhoo)
 South Province (consisting of Gnaviyani Atoll and Addu City; capital: Hithadhoo)

The seven provinces closely correspond to the historic divisions of Uthuru Boduthiladhunmathi. Dhekunu Boduthiladhunmathi, Uthuru Medhu-Raajje, Medhu-Raajje, Dhekunu Medhu-Raajje, Huvadhu (or Uthuru Suvadinmathi) and Addumulah (or Dhekunu Suvadinmathi).

Decentralization
On 15 October 2010, the government released a finalized list of the administrative constituencies established under the Decentralization Act. It listed 189 administrative constituencies. Out of these constituencies:
 4 constituencies were declared "cities", as according to the criteria for determining cities in this act. These constituencies were Male', Fuvahmulah, Kulhudhuffushi and Seenu Atoll. After a referendum among the people, Seenu Atoll was renamed "Addu City".  Each city would be served by a city council.
 189 constituencies were declared "islands", as according to the criteria for determining islands in this act. These islands are grouped together into 17 atolls. Each atoll shall be served by an atoll council (which will be located on the capital island of the respective atoll), under which each island has its own island council.

Therefore, the final organization of the administrative divisions are as below:
 17 atolls
 4 cities
 189 islands

National Offices
Although the earlier provincial decentralization was rejected by Parliament, President Nasheed reinstated the concept through "National Administrations". The National Administrations of Maldives were in the same divisions as the earlier provinces, and the previous province offices were reinstated as the office of that National Administration, to which the atoll councils reported to accordingly. The National Administrations acted as an extension of the central government in Male' for the convenience of dealing with regional affairs. The National Administrations operated under the Ministry of Home Affairs.
The seven National Administrations were:-
 Upper North National Administration
 North National Administration
 North Central National Administration
 Central National Administration
 South Central National Administration
 Upper South National Administration
 South National Administration

Each administration was headed by a state minister assigned by the president.

All 7 National Offices were abolished by the Waheed administration on 24 April 2012.

Local Council Election 2011
On 5 February 2011, the country's first ever Local council elections were held to elect 188 island councils, 19 atoll councils and 2 city councils. 
The island of Felivaru, in Lhaviyani Atoll did not participate in the election, since being a newly declared inhabited island, did not have any person registered as a citizen of the island. , the island council election for Felivaru has yet to take place.

Divisions
The first-level divisions are cities and atolls.

City
A city is an inhabited area with a population of 10,000+. The criteria also includes a certain level of economic development and facilities available. A city has a "city council" which governs over the affairs of the city, and keeps communication with the central government. A city will not be included within an administrative atoll. A city has further subdivisions called "wards" or "districts". A city council will also govern over any uninhabited islands or resort islands within its designated area. 
There are four cities in Maldives. They are Male', Addu, Fuvahmulah and Kulhudhuffushi.

Atoll
The administrative definition of an "atoll" differs from the actual meaning of the word 'atoll'. While naturally, an "atoll" refers to a ring of islands, an "atoll" in the administrative sense, refers to a group of "island" class constituencies, not necessarily within the requirements of a natural atoll.  While the majority of administrative atolls are indeed natural atolls, there are exceptions. Each administrative atoll has an "atoll council" which monitors the work of the "island councils" in the atoll, and keep communications with the central government. An atoll council also governs all uninhabited islands and resort islands in their area. 
There are 18 atolls in Maldives.

Island
The administrative definition of an "island" differs from the actual meaning of the word 'island'. While naturally, an "island" refers to a land-mass surrounded by water, an "island" in the administrative sense, refers to a specified inhabited area within an administrative atoll, which is governed over by an "island council". While the majority of "island" class constituencies are indeed natural islands. There are 189 such islands, each with its own island council. (Except for Felivaru, Lhaviyani Atoll)

Codes and Names of the Administrative Divisions
Every first-level administrative division of the Maldives have the following:

An official name, for example Thiladhunmathi Uthuruburi (meaning Thiladhunmathi North).  This corresponds to the geographical Maldivian name of the Atoll. 
A Maldivian code letter, for example: Haa Alifu. When there are two letters, the second stands either for "North" (Alifu) or for "South" (Dhaalu).  This code was adopted for convenience. It began in order to facilitate radio communication between the atolls and the central administration. As there are certain islands in different atolls that have the same name, for administrative purposes this code is quoted before the name of the island: for example, Baa Funadhoo, Kaafu Funadhoo, Gaafu-Alifu Funadhoo. This code denomination has been very much misused by foreigners and tourists who do not understand the proper use of these names, and the true Maldivian names have often been ignored in publications for tourists. Maldivians may use the letter code name in colloquial conversation, but in serious geographic, historical or cultural writings, the true geographical name always takes precedence.

A Latin code letter, for example: (A).  The Latin code letter is normally used in boat registration plates. The letter stands for the atoll and the number for the island.

Each atoll has a capital island. All islands of every atoll have their own official name. 
All cities have an official name, and names for their subdivisions. They also have a Latin code letter assigned to them.

Traditionally, Maldivians call the atolls ending in '-madulu' or '-mathi' by their name without adding the word 'Atoll' at the end. For example, it is correct to write simply Kolhumadulu, without adding the word 'Atholhu' or 'Atoll'. This is also the case in the atoll known as Faadhippolhu as well as the small detached atoll of Fuvahmulah.

First-level administrative Divisions of Maldives

Atolls

Cities

See also
List of islands of the Maldives
Atolls of the Maldives
ISO 3166-2:MV

References

Muhammadu Ibrahim Lutfee. Divehiraajjege Jōgrafīge Vanavaru.  G.Sōsanī. Malé 1999. 
Hasan A. Maniku. The Islands of Maldives. Novelty. Male 1983.
Hasan A. Maniku. Changes in the Topography of the Maldives. Novelty. Male 1990.
Inaaz A. Wahhab. The katheeb of the island. Kaamaraa. Male 1970.

External links
 Attols of Maldives site
 statoid site

 
Maldives
Maldives
Administrative divisions
Administrative atolls of the Maldives
Decentralization